Kanjanaporn Saengkoon (born 18 July 1996) is a Thai international footballer who plays as a midfielder.

She was selected for the 2019 FIFA Women's World Cup. On the club level, she plays for BG-Bundit Asia.

References

External links

1996 births
Living people
Women's association football defenders
Kanjanaporn Saengkoon
Kanjanaporn Saengkoon
2019 FIFA Women's World Cup players
Kanjanaporn Saengkoon
Kanjanaporn Saengkoon